Knez or Knyaz is a South Slavic surname, coming from the title knez. It may refer to:

 Dejan Knez, a Slovenian artist
 Tomislav Knez, a Bosnian footballer
 Iván Knez, an Argentine-Swiss footballer
 Nikodim Tsarknias (Tsar-Knyaz), a Macedonian Eastern Orthodox priest in Greece